Tuerta is a genus of moths of the family Noctuidae. The genus was erected by Francis Walker in 1869.

Species
 Tuerta chrysochlora Walker, 1869
 Tuerta cyanopasta Hampson, 1907
 Tuerta pastocyana Berio, 1940

References

Agaristinae